Echinomastus (meaning "spiny breast") is a genus of cacti. They are native to the southwestern United States and Mexico.

Species
There are up to 7 species, including:

References

http://southwestdesertflora.com/
https://www.americansouthwest.net/plants/index.html

Cactoideae
Cactoideae genera